Sommo is a comune (municipality) in the province of Pavia in the Italian region Lombardy, about 40 km south of Milan and about 8 km southwest of Pavia, on the eastern border of Lomellina traditional region.

Sommo borders the following municipalities: Bastida Pancarana, Cava Manara, Zinasco.

References

Cities and towns in Lombardy